The 2019 Senior Bowl was an all-star college football exhibition game played on January 26, 2019, at 1:30 p.m. CST, at Ladd–Peebles Stadium in Mobile, Alabama. The game featured prospects for the 2019 draft of the professional National Football League (NFL), predominantly from the 2018 NCAA Division I FBS football season, rostered into "North" and "South" teams. The game was the last of the 2018–19 bowl games and the final game of the 2018 FBS football season. It was sponsored by Reese's Peanut Butter Cups and officially known as the Reese's Senior Bowl, with television coverage provided by NFL Network.

Coaching staffs were announced on December 31, 2018; Jon Gruden and the Oakland Raiders staff for the North team, and Kyle Shanahan and the San Francisco 49ers staff for the South team.

Players
In August 2018, bowl organizers had an initial "watch list" of 374 players, with a total of 110 players to be invited to the game. By mid-December, 95 players had accepted invitations to play in the game, with eight quarterbacks announced.

Players who accepted invitations to the game are listed on the official website. While team assignments follow general geographical guidelines (e.g. Penn State players on the North roster), there are multiple variances due to competitive and roster-balancing considerations (e.g. Buffalo players on the South roster).

North team
Full roster online here.

South team
Full roster online here.

Hills was MVP of 2019 NFLPA Collegiate Bowl

Game summary

Scoring summary

Note: special playing rules detailed here.

Source:

Statistics

Source:

Source:

References

Further reading

External links
 Box score at ESPN
 2019 NFL Draft recap at seniorbowl.com

Senior Bowl
Senior Bowl
January 2019 sports events in the United States
Senior Bowl